Heavy Starch is the debut studio album by American rapper Ali of St. Lunatics. It was released on April 30, 2002, via Universal Records. The album features guest appearances from fellow St. Lunatics members Kyjuan, Murphy Lee, & Nelly, St. Louis Alumni, Ms. Toi, Kandi Burruss, Toya, and Waiel "Wally" Yaghnam. Its first single was "Boughetto" featuring Murphy Lee.

In the United States, Heavy Starch debuted at number 24 on the Billboard 200 and peaked at number seven on Billboards Top R&B/Hip-Hop Albums.

Track listing

Charts

References

External links

2002 debut albums
Universal Records albums